Tongue-in-cheek refers to a humorous or sarcastic statement expressed in a mock serious manner.

Tongue-in-cheek may also refer to:

 Tongue n' Cheek, a 2009 album by British rapper Dizzee Rascal
 Tongue 'n' Cheek, a British electro music band

See also
 The Anatomy of the Tongue in Cheek, a 2001 album by Christian rock band Relient K
 Cheek (disambiguation)